Fawaz Alhokair (born 1965/66) is a Saudi billionaire property developer.

In 1989, he founded Fawaz Abdulaziz Alhokair Group with his two brothers, and started with just two menswear stores. The company now has 19 shopping malls in Saudi Arabia, and the local franchise rights to brands including Zara, Banana Republic, Gap, Nine West and Topshop.

Alhokair lives in Riyadh, Saudi Arabia.

Later, in June 2021, it was reported that the apartment will be listed for $170 million.

References

20th-century Saudi Arabian businesspeople
21st-century Saudi Arabian businesspeople
1960s births
Living people
People from Riyadh
Real estate and property developers
Saudi Arabian billionaires